, known as a solo artist by the stage name  is a Japanese-Mexican drummer and vocalist. Originally a member of the rock band The News, she debuted as a solo musician in 2012 and released her debut album Kavkanize in 2013. She prominently plays the drums in all of her promotions.

Shishido was given the name "Kavka" for her stage name by copy editor Junpei Watanabe. Shishido always wore black, reminding her of a crow. She picked the Czech word , which refers to the daurian jackdaw.

Biography 
Shishido was born in Mexico in 1985 to Japanese parents. She lived there until she was two, later going to Japan for elementary school. Between the ages of 13 and 14, Shishido lived in Argentina. She learned Spanish to use in her daily life, though on returning to Japan forgot it since she had nobody with whom to practice. When she was 14, Shishido was inspired to take up the drums after seeing a live performance on TV. She enjoyed the idea of the drummer being an "unsung hero" of the band, after noticing the camera never focused on the drummer.  She was first taught the basics of drumming at 14, by Daniel "Pipi" Piazzolla, a drummer and grandson of tango musician Astor Piazzolla.

Shishido started performing with her own vocals at age 20. In 2004, Shishido joined the all-female band The News as their third drummer. In 2005, Shishido started collaborating with The High-Lows' drummer Kenji Ohshima and Uverworld producer Satoru Hiraide, and made a band called Eddy12 (stylized as eddy12) together. During this period, Shishido started to perform in her signature style, performing the drums and singing simultaneously.

While in Eddy12, Shishido was scouted by a record company for her to debut as a solo musician. She was scouted before she started performing the drums as part of her act, but added them back in during discussions for how to set her apart from other musicians. She left The News in 2009, however continued to work with her Eddy12 bandmates who act as producers. She debuted under Imperial Records with the digital single "Day Dream Rider" in May 2012. Since then, Shishido released three physical singles, "Aisuru Kakugo", "Music" and "Kiken na Futari". The latter was used as the opening theme song for the TV Asahi drama Doubles: Futari no Keiji. Shishido released her debut album, Kavkanize, on September 4, 2013. In February 2014, Shishido held her first Japanese tour after the release of her single "Wagamama"/"Miss. Miss Me".

In September, it was announced that Shishido had switched labels to the newly created Justa Music, a sub-label of Avex Group, and would star in the second series of Erika Sawajiri fashion drama First Class. Her first release under the label is the song "Don't Be Love" featuring veteran singer-songwriter Kazuyoshi Saito, and will be used as the theme song of the 2015 Fuji Television drama Isha-tachi no Ren'ai Jijō. This song also serves as the leading track from K5, a special extended play where Shishido will collaborate with five different musicians, released in June 2015.

Other ventures 
Since her debut as a musician, Shishido has worked as a runway model. She has participated in the Kobe Collection 2012, Tokyo Runway in 2012 and 2013, Laforet Fashion Week 2012, and Fukuoka Asia Collection 2013. Shishido made her acting debut in the live action film adaptation of Ai Ore! in 2012. Shishido debuted as a radio personality in 2013, and has radio shows on All Night Nippon and Bay FM. Shishido also became the drummer for the house band on the KinKi Kids' variety show Shin Dōmoto Kyōdai in 2013. In 2014 she joined the second season of the Erika Sawajiri drama First Class, as fashion designer Namie Kawashima. Since October 21, 2018 Shishido Kavka and Santiago Vazquez invite several musicians to an improvised presentation called "el tempo", which interacts with the public through hand signals, inspired by the events “LA BOMBA DE TIEMPO” and “LA GRANDE” that have been taking place since 2006 in Buenos Aires, where she grew up.

Products and endorsements 
Shishido starred in her first nationwide commercial for Glico's snack food Pretz, which debuted in February 2013. It features Shishido playing the drums in the Strahov Monastery library in Prague.

Discography

Studio albums

Extended plays

Singles

As a lead artist

As a featured artist

Promotional singles

Participation in albums

Filmography

See also

Notes

References

External links 
  
  
 

21st-century Japanese singers
21st-century Japanese women singers
1985 births
Citizens of Japan through descent
Women drummers
Japanese actresses
Japanese female models
Japanese women pop singers
Japanese women rock singers
Japanese women singer-songwriters
Japanese singer-songwriters
Japanese rock drummers
Japanese television personalities
Spanish-language singers of Japan
Living people
Mexican people of Japanese descent
21st-century drummers